Platyptilia picta is a moth of the family Pterophoridae. It is known from Kenya.

References

picta
Endemic moths of Kenya
Moths described in 1913
Moths of Africa